Đurđevo is a village located in the Žabalj municipality, in the South Bačka District of Serbia. It is situated in the autonomous province of Vojvodina. The village has a Serb ethnic majority and its population numbering 5,137 people (2002 census). Besides Serbs (numbering 3,538 people), the village also has a large Rusyn minority (numbering 1,197 people).

Name
In Serbian the village is known as Đurđevo (Ђурђево); in Rusyn as Дюрдьов; and in Hungarian as Sajkásgyörgye.

Historical population

1961: 4,669
1971: 4,531
1981: 4,668
1991: 4,517
2002: 5,137
2011: 5,042

References
Slobodan Ćurčić, Broj stanovnika Vojvodine, Novi Sad, 1996.

See also
List of places in Serbia
List of cities, towns and villages in Vojvodina

Places in Bačka
South Bačka District
Pannonian Rusyns